The cinnamon becard (Pachyramphus cinnamomeus) is a passerine bird found in Latin America.

Taxonomy
It has been placed with the tityras in the cotinga or the tyrant flycatcher families by various authors, but the evidence strongly suggest the tityras and their closest relatives are better separated as Tityridae. The AOU for example advocates this separation.

Description
The adult cinnamon becard is 5.5 in (14 cm) long and weighs 0.6–0.8 oz (17–22 g). It is rufous above and paler cinnamon below, with a grey bill and legs. Unlike other becards, the sexes are similar, but the young are brighter above and paler overall. Northern birds have a pale supercilium and dusky line from the bill to the eye, but the subspecies Pachyramphus cinnamomeus magdalenae west of the Andes shows more contrast, with a stronger supercilium and blackish loral line.

The calls include high thin whistles. The males' song is a plaintive ascending dee dee dee dee dee dee de while the females' is a weaker deeeu dew dew, dew dew.

Distribution and habitat
The cinnamon becard is a resident breeding species from south-eastern Mexico south to north-western Ecuador and north-western Venezuela. It was recently found to be far more common on the Amazonian slope of the Colombian Cordillera Oriental than previously believed.

It occurs over a wide range of altitudes, from almost sea level to (albeit rarely) more than 5,000 ft (1,700 m) ASL; they prefer disturbed habitat like open woodland including forest edges and clearings, mangroves, and secondary forest e.g. dominated by Naked Albizia (Albizia carbonaria, Fabaceae).

Behaviour

Breeding
The nest, built by the female at the tip of a high tree branch 8–50 ft (2.5–15 m) up, is a spherical structure of plant material with a low entrance, which for protection is often built near a wasp nest. The typical clutch is 3–4 olive brown-blotched brownish white eggs, laid between March and July and incubated by the female alone for 18–20 days to hatching. The male helps to feed the young.

Feeding
Cinnamon becards pick large insects and spiders off the foliage in flight. They also regularly hover to take small berries.

References

References

 Hilty, Steven L. (2003): Birds of Venezuela. Christopher Helm, London. 
 Stiles, F. Gary & Skutch, Alexander Frank (1989): A guide to the birds of Costa Rica. Comistock, Ithaca. 
 Salaman, Paul G. W.; Stiles, F. Gary; Bohórquez, Clara Isabel; Álvarez-R., Mauricio; Umaña, Ana María; Donegan, Thomas M. & Cuervo, Andrés M. (2002): New and noteworthy bird records from the east slope of the Andes of Colombia. Caldasia 24(1): 157–189. PDF fulltext
 South American Classification Committee (SACC) (2007): Proposal #313 - Adopt the Family Tityridae.

Further reading

cinnamon becard
cinnamon becard
Birds of Central America
Birds of Colombia
Birds of the Tumbes-Chocó-Magdalena
cinnamon becard
cinnamon becard